The Asia/Oceania Zone was the unique zone within Group 3 of the regional Davis Cup competition in 2021. The zone's competition was held in round robin format in Amman, Jordan, from 15 to 18 September 2021.

Participating nations

Withdrawn nations

Draw
Date: 15–18 September 2021

Location: Jordan Tennis Federation, Amman, Jordan (hard)

Format: Round-robin basis. Three pools of three teams will contest the round-robin stage of the event. The top two teams in each pool will play-off, with the three winners earning promotion. The bottom team in each pool will be relegated to Asia/Oceania Group IV.

Seeding

 1Davis Cup Rankings as of 8 March 2021

Round Robin

Pool A

Pool B

Pool C

Standings are determined by: 1. number of wins; 2. number of matches; 3. in two-team ties, head-to-head records; 4. in three-team ties, (a) percentage of sets won (head-to-head records if two teams remain tied), then (b) percentage of games won (head-to-head records if two teams remain tied), then (c) Davis Cup rankings.

Playoffs

Round Robin

Pool A

Hong Kong vs. Malaysia

Hong Kong vs. Kuwait

Kuwait vs. Malaysia

Pool B

Vietnam vs. Pacific Oceania

Vietnam vs. Qatar

Qatar vs. Pacific Oceania

Pool C

Syria vs. Jordan

Syria vs. Sri Lanka

Sri Lanka vs. Jordan

Promotional play-offs

Hong Kong vs. Jordan

Vietnam vs. Malaysia

Syria vs. Pacific Oceania

Final placements 

References

External links
Official Website

Davis Cup Asia/Oceania Zone
Asia